"Lemon Pepper Freestyle" is a song by Canadian rapper Drake, featuring vocals from American rapper Rick Ross. It was released as the third out of three tracks from Drake's fourth extended play, Scary Hours 2, through Republic Records and OVO Sound, on March 5, 2021. The two artists wrote the song alongside Boi-1da, Coco O., and Robin Hannibal, while it was produced by Boi-1da and Austin Powerz with uncredited co-production from FnZ and Keanu Beats. It contains a sample from "Pressure" by Quadron.

Background
Before the song was released, Drake and Rick Ross had over fifteen collaborations, including two 2019 singles: "Money in the Grave" by Drake and "Gold Roses" by Rick Ross.
 
Drake reflects on "what it's like going to parent-teacher conferences as a superstar". The song has inspired various people, American professional basketball player Giannis Antetokounmpo, from the Milwaukee Bucks posted a video of himself eating lemon and pepper wings. American rapper Wynne freestyled over the instrumental of the song.

Critical reception
Jordan Rose of Variety felt that the song has Rick Ross "stepping aside after the opening to let Drake go an hour on the beat and deliver one of his most mature verses in recent memory" and Drake "is beyond waxing poetic solely about the things he still wants".

Personnel 
Credits adapted from Tidal.
 
 Drake – lead vocals, songwriting
 Rick Ross – featured vocals, songwriting
 Boi-1da – production, songwriting
 Coco O. – songwriting
 Robin Hannibal – songwriting
 Austin Powerz – production
 FnZ – uncredited co-production
 Keanu Beats – uncredited co-production
 40 – co-production, mixing, studio personnel
 Chris Athens – mastering, studio personnel
 Noel Cadastre – recording, engineering, studio personnel

Charts

Weekly charts

Year-end charts

Certifications

References

 

 
2021 songs
Drake (musician) songs
Rick Ross songs
Songs written by Drake (musician)
Songs written by Rick Ross
Songs written by Boi-1da
Songs written by Robin Hannibal
Song recordings produced by Boi-1da